Grigory Dmitriyevich Stroganov (25 January 1656 – 21 November 1715) was a Russian landowner and statesman, the most notable member of the prominent Stroganov family in the late 17th century-early 18th century, a strong supporter of the reforms and initiatives of Peter the Great. The surname is also transcribed as Stroganoff. Beef Stroganoff is named after this family.

Grigory Stroganov was the only son of Dmitri Andreyevich Stroganov. His name first appears in the public record in 1672, when he visited Moscow with gifts for Tsar Alexei Mikhailovich on the occasion of the birth of Tsarevich Peter.  Dmitiri Stroganoff died the next year and the tsar issued a gramota confirming Grigory's inheritance of one third of the Stroganov family fortune. When the heirs of Yakov Stroganov, the senior branch of the family, died off in 1681, Grigory inherited another one third of the Stroganov lands. The last third, owned by the wife of Fyodor Petrovich Stroganov, passed to him on 18 January 1686.

According to the accounting of Fyodor Volegov (d. 1856), this consolidation increased Grigory Stroganov's personal holdings dramatically, to more than ten million desiatinas of land (103,000 square kilometers) with more than 200 villages and 15,000 adult male serfs. This figure does not include his estates in Moscow (e.g. Vlakhernskoye-Kuzminki), Nizhny Novgorod and Solvychegodsk. Grigory Stroganov was the largest Russian landowner after the tsar.

Beginning in 1682 he regularly assisted the government in its financial difficulties. In 1700 Stroganov funded the construction of several military ships for the nascent Imperial Russian Navy. For his services Grigory Stroganov received numerous awards, honorary distinctions and additional lands.

A major factor in Stroganov's power was his saltern enterprise, whose efficiency greatly improved under his management. However, he lost this advantage in 1705, when the state established a salt monopoly.

Grigory Stroganov married twice, first to Princess Vassa Meshcherskaya, and then to Princess Maria Novosiltseva. Three children from the second marriage survived children: Alexander (b. 1699), Nikolay (b. 1700) and Sergey (b. 1700).

References

 

Grigory Dmitriyevich
1656 births
1715 deaths
Russian landowners